Senator Nesbitt may refer to:

Aric Nesbitt (born 1980), Michigan State Senate
Martin Nesbitt (politician) (1946–2014), North Carolina Senate
Robert Taylor Nesbitt (1843–1913), Georgia State Senate